Roberto Juárez or Juarez may refer to:

 Roberto Carlos Juárez (born 1984), Mexican footballer
 Roberto Juarez (artist) (born 1952), American visual artist